Rough Trade may refer to:
Rough Trade Records, a record label
Rough Trade (shops), London record stores
Rough Trade (band), a Canadian new wave rock band
"Rough Trade" (American Dad!), an episode of American Dad!
Rough trade (slang), a gay slang term
"Rough Trade", a song by Stephanie Mills from the album I've Got the Cure